Fellinger is a surname. Notable people with the surname include:

David Fellinger (born 1969), Scottish footballer
Károly Fellinger (born 1963), Hungarian poet, writer, and local historian
Marloes Fellinger (born 1982),  Dutch softball player

See also
Felsinger